Ethan Dumortier (born 29 December 2000) is a French professional rugby union player, who plays as a wing or a centre for Top 14 club Lyon.

Club career
Dumortier started his professional career with Lyon during the 2019–20 European Challenge Cup. On 29 November 2020, he made his Top 14 debuts for Lyon in a home win against Stade Français.

International career
Dumortier  was first called to the France senior team in October 2022 for the Autumn internationals.

International tries

Honours

Lyon
 EPCR Challenge Cup: 2021–22

France U20
 World Rugby Under 20 Championship: 2019

References

External link
All.rugby profile

2000 births
Sportspeople from Lyon
Living people
French rugby union players
Rugby union wings
Lyon OU players